Men of Mark: Eminent, Progressive and Rising (1887) is an anthology of 177 short biographies of African-American men written by Rev. William J. Simmons, a Baptist minister and college administrator. The book has been called the "single most authoritative work on nineteenth-century African Americans". Henry McNeal Turner, a noted African Methodist Episcopal minister and leader, wrote the introduction.

Background
When his book was published, Simmons was a Baptist minister who was president of the State University of Kentucky, a historically black college in Louisville, Kentucky. (It was later renamed as Simmons College in his honor.) A leading figure in African-American society, Simmons personally knew many of the subjects of the book.

Description
Based on primary source material such as "speeches, sermons, and articles,", Simmons wrote short biographies of many prominent African-American men and historic figures, such as Crispus Attucks, Frederick Douglass, Henry Highland Garnet, and Alexander Crummell, as well as lesser known ones. The range of occupations include attorneys, carpenters, pastors, merchants, phrenologists, artists, and scholars. Most of these men had parents who had been enslaved or were themselves born into slavery, although most gained emancipation in the nineteenth century.

Simmons was supportive of black nationalism, such as that espoused by Henry McNeal Turner, an influential African Methodist Episcopal minister who wrote an introduction and biographical sketch of Simmons for this collection. Simmons gained lasting fame from his book. He planned a companion volume about notable African-American women, but died suddenly in 1890.

This book has been called the "single most authoritative work on nineteenth-century African Americans". The entries demonstrate the leading role that religious leaders played in African-American life and identity of the time. Seventy-one of the 177 biographies are of Christian ministers; there were nearly three times as many ministers as men of any other profession. Simmons writes in his preface that these examples were intended to show how people develop themselves, and could be used for students.

Simmons stressed the positive aspects of the lives he examined, which was typical of histories of that period. Baptist scholar William H. Brackney described them as "hagiographic". The book was reprinted in 1968 by Arno Press.

Numerous other biographical anthologies covering African Americans were published around this time, as blacks became educated and worked to establish their place in United States life and history. Among the works were two separate books about women of color published in 1893: Noted Negro Women by Monroe Alpheus Majors and Women of Distinction by Lawson A. Scruggs, both published in 1893.

Table of contents

References

External links
 Electronic Edition at Documenting the American South, University of North Carolina
 Edition at archive.org

1887 non-fiction books
Books about African-American history
Lists of African-American people
United States biographical dictionaries